Melissa Femling (born November 20, 1970), known professionally as Melissa Disney, is an American voice actress and writer. Her best known role to date was as the voice of the titular character in the Nickelodeon animated series As Told by Ginger.

Background
She is the daughter of writer Carl Femling and occasional actress Louise (née Gallagher), and granddaughter of silent film actress Toy Gallagher. She has often claimed to be a very distant relative of American film producer and businessman Walt Disney.

Career
Disney is one of a small number of women who do voice-over work for movie trailers. The trailer for Gone in 60 Seconds, which she voiced in 2000, was one of the first by a major film studio to use a female voice.

She voiced the title character Ginger Foutley in the animated cartoon As Told by Ginger. She is also known for her role as Elora the Faun in Spyro 2: Ripto's Rage! and Courtney Gears (a parody of both Courtney Love and Britney Spears) in Ratchet & Clank: Up Your Arsenal.

She appeared as the character Melinda Chisney in Lake Bell's directorial debut In a World..., a movie about voice artists.

Personal life 
Disney is married to actor and writer Ryan Paul James. They were married on October 15, 2010, in San Diego, California.

Filmography

Film
 Batman Beyond: Return of the Joker – Bobbi "Blade" Sommer
 Foodfight! – Additional voices
 In a World... – Melinda Chisney
 Reasons of the Heart – Crystal
 Rusty: A Dog's Tale – Boo the Cat
 Superman Unbound - Thara (Video)
 Superman vs. The Elite - Menagerie (Video) 
 The Croods: A New Age - Guy's Mother
 The Life & Adventures of Santa Claus – Gardenia, Village Girl
 The Trumpet of the Swan – Billie
 Top Cat: The Movie – Trixie

Television
 35th Annual Key Art Awards – Announcer
 84th Academy Awards – Announcer
 As Told by Ginger – Ginger Foutley
 Batman Beyond – Bobbi "Blade" Sommer, Curaré
 Detention – Brittney
 I Am Weasel – Mike, Judge
 iCarly – Debbie
 Jakers! The Adventures of Piggley Winks – Meggie
 Justice League Action - Mom / Brat 
 Static Shock – Nurse
 Superman: The Animated Series - College Girl
 The Christmas Lamb – Jacob, Talia, Little Boy
 92nd Academy Awards - Announcer
 The Garfield Show - Nathan (Season 1)

Video games 
 102 Dalmatians: Puppies to the Rescue - Fidget, Priscilla
 Animorphs: Know the Secret – Rachel
 Baldur's Gate – Imoen, Ithmeera
 Baldur's Gate: Siege of Dragonspear - Imoen
 Baldur's Gate II: Shadows of Amn – Imoen, Surayah Farrahd
 Baldur's Gate II: Throne of Bhaal – Imoen
 Bee Movie Game – Vanessa Bloome
 Deadpool – Rogue, Psylocke, Spirit
 Disney Princess: Enchanted Journey – The Narrator/Zara
 Epic Mickey 2: The Power of Two - Additional Voices
 EverQuest II – Various Voices
 Fallout Tactics: Brotherhood of Steel – Evita Eastwood
 Jade Empire – Doctor An, Scholar Cai, Attendant Kitan, additional voices 
 Interstate '82 – Skye Champion
 Kingdom Hearts II – Vivi Ornitier
 Marvel Heroes 2016 – American Dream
 Prototype 2 – Sabrina Galloway
 Prey – Science Operator AI
 Ratchet & Clank – Starlene
 Ratchet & Clank: Up Your Arsenal – Courtney Gears, Soap Actress Janice
 Secret Agent Clank – Courtney Gears
 Shark Tale – Angie
 Spyro 2: Ripto's Rage! – Elora the Faun, Handel, Greta
 Tony Hawk's Underground - Female Custom Skater
 Tony Hawk's Underground 2 - Female Custom Skater (voice 1)

Videos 
 Hermie & Friends: Hermie: A Common Caterpillar – Lucy Ladybug
 Hermie & Friends: A Fruitcake Christmas – Lucy Ladybug
 Hermie & Friends: Buzby, the Misbehaving Bee – Lucy Ladybug, Hailey, Bailey
 Hermie & Friends: Flo the Lyin' Fly – Lucy Ladybug
 Hermie & Friends: Hermie and the High Seas – Hailey
 Hermie & Friends: Milo the Mantis Who Wouldn't Pray – Lucy Ladybug, Hailey, Bailey
 Hermie & Friends: Skeeter and the Mystery of the Lost Mosquito Treasure – Hailey
 Hermie & Friends: The Flo Show Creates a Buzz – Hailey
 Hermie & Friends: To Share or Nut to Share – Lucy Ladybug
 Hermie & Friends: Webster the Scaredy Spider – Lucy Ladybug

Awards 
Disney won a Key Art Award for voicing the Gone in 60 Seconds movie trailer.

Notes and references

External links 
 
 

1970 births
Living people
American video game actresses
American voice actresses
American women writers
Place of birth missing (living people)
20th-century American actresses
21st-century American actresses